The 2009–10 Liga Alef season was the first season since the 1998–99 Liga Alef season, in which Liga Alef regained its status as the third tier of Israeli football, due to the closure of Liga Artzit.

Maccabi Ironi Jatt (champions of the North Division) and Hapoel Herzliya (champions of the South Division) won the title and promotion to Liga Leumit.

Promotion and relegation play-offs held. however, from the promotion play-offs, no club achieved promotion to Liga Leumit, as Liga Alef second placed play-off winner, Maccabi HaShikma Ramat Hen went down to Maccabi Be'er Sheva of Liga Leumit in the decisive match.

Changes from last season

Format changes
 Following the scrapping of Liga Artzit, Liga Alef became the third tier of the Israeli football league system.
 Both divisions were expanded from 14 clubs to 16 clubs.
 The runners-up would participate in a promotion play-offs, first playing against each other, then the winner playing the 14th placed Liga Leumit club.
 The third-from-bottom clubs in each division would participate in a relegation play-offs, playing against the winner of the Liga Bet promotion play-offs.

Team changes
 Ahva Arraba and Maccabi Be'er Sheva F.C. were promoted to Liga Leumit; Maccabi Ironi Kiryat Ata (to North division) were relegated from Liga Leumit.
 Hapoel Bnei Jadeidi, Maccabi Kafr Kanna, Maccabi Tirat HaCarmel and Hapoel Bnei Tamra from Liga Artzit were placed in North division.
 Hapoel Herzliya and Maccabi HaShikma Ramat Hen were transferred from North division to South division.
 Beitar Safed merged with Liga Bet team Hapoel Karmiel to form F.C. Karmiel Safed. The merged team was placed in North division.
 Maccabi Ironi Shlomi/Nahariya and Beitar Ihud Mashhad were relegated to Liga Bet from North division; Maccabi Ironi Jatt and Maccabi Umm al-Fahm were promoted to the North division from Liga Bet.
 Ironi Ramla and Hapoel Masos/Segev Shalom were relegated to Liga Bet from South division; Shimshon Bnei Tayibe and Hapoel Tzafririm Holon were promoted to the South division from Liga Bet.
 As a further place was available in South division, Maccabi Amishav Petah Tikva, as the best runner-up in the Liga Bet, was also promoted.

North Division

South Division

Promotion play-offs
The 2nd placed clubs in each division, Ironi Sayid Umm al-Fahm and Maccabi HaShikma Ramat Hen faced each other in Haberfeld Stadium, Rishon LeZion, and the winner advanced to the decisive play-off match against the 14th placed Liga Leumit club Maccabi Be'er Sheva.

Maccabi HaShikma Ramat Hen qualified for the decisive play-off match against Maccabi Be'er Sheva.

Maccabi Be'er Sheva remained in Liga Leumit.

Relegation play-offs

North play-off
Hapoel Bnei Jadeidi (which replaced the disqualified 14th placed club in Liga Alef North, Hapoel Bnei Tamra) faced the Liga Bet play-offs winner, Hapoel Ramot Menashe Megiddo. the winner earned a spot in the 2010–11 Liga Alef.

Hapoel Bnei Jadeidi relegated to Liga Bet.

South play-off
The 14th placed club in Liga Alef South, Shimshon Bnei Tayibe, faced the Liga Bet play-offs winner, Ironi Ramla. the winner earned a spot in the 2010–11 Liga Alef.

Shimshon Bnei Tayibe remained in Liga Alef.

References
Liga Alef North 2009/2010 The Israel Football Association 
Liga Alef South 2009/2010 The Israel Football Association 

Liga Alef seasons
3
Israel